The Day After the Revolution is a 2017 nonfiction book of writings of Vladimir Lenin edited by Slavoj Žižek, who also provides an extensive introduction. Published by socialist media group Verso Books, the work consists of writings from after the Soviet victory during the Russian Civil War up to his death in 1924. Žižek describes this body of writings as significant to understanding the philosophical potential of Lenin's revolutionary ideology and its significance to contemporary leftism.

Remembering, Repeating and Working Through
The Slovenian Marxist philosopher presents the introduction to the collection of Lenin's writings, which he begins by analogising the dialectical conflicts of Marxism with the Freudian conception of "working through" repressions to therapeutically benefit individuals psychologically. To Žižek, the failures of leftism in the 20th century, constituted by the failure of the USSR, constitutes a collective trauma to the political left that must be overcome through the titular "Remembering, Repeating, and Working Through".

Reception

References

2017 non-fiction books
Marxist works
Vladimir Lenin
Verso Books books
Books about revolutions
Books about communism
Books about socialism
Political books
Philosophy books